Hezar Kandi (also Romanized as Hezār Kandī; also known as Hezār Qeshlāqī) is a village in Qeshlaq-e Shomali Rural District, in the Central District of Parsabad County, Ardabil Province, Iran. At the 2006 census, its population was 688, in 152 families.

References 

Towns and villages in Parsabad County